Mağara (former Mara or Kırobası) is a village in Silifke district of Mersin Province, Turkey. It is situated in the Taurus Mountains. The population of village is 233  as of 2010, but boasted a much higher population during medieval times. The Greeks who made up a part of the population were deported to Greece during the compulsory population exchange between Greece and Turkey in 1920s. Modern day Mağara is known for its annual commemoration day for Marshal Fevzi Çakmak.

References

Villages in Silifke District